The 1979 Basildon District Council election took place on 3 May 1979 to elect members of Basildon District Council in Essex, England. This was on the same day as other local elections. It was the first election to be held on new ward boundaries. The council remained under no overall control.

Overall results

|-
| colspan=2 style="text-align: right; margin-right: 1em" | Total
| style="text-align: right;" | 42
| colspan=5 |
| style="text-align: right;" | 81,221
| style="text-align: right;" |

Ward results

Billericay East (3 seats)

Billericay West (3 seats)

Burstead (3 seats)

Fryerns Central (3 seats)

Fryerns East (3 seats)

Laindon (3 seats)

Langdon Hills (3 seats)

Lee Chapel North (3 seats)

Nethermayne (3 seats)

Pitsea East (3 seats)

Pitsea West (3 seats)

Vange (3 seats)

Wickford North (3 seats)

Wickford South (3 seats)

References

1979
1979 English local elections
1970s in Essex